The 1917 Wellington City mayoral election was part of the New Zealand local elections held that same year. In 1917, elections were held for the Mayor of Wellington plus other local government positions including fifteen city councillors, also elected biannually. The polling was conducted using the standard first-past-the-post electoral method.

Background
John Luke, the incumbent Mayor sought re-election and retained office unopposed with no other candidates emerging. The current Labour Party contested its first election since unification the previous year. It put forward a small ticket that was still large enough to win a majority, however just as in 1915 no Labour candidates were successful.

Councillor results

Notes

References

Mayoral elections in Wellington
1917 elections in New Zealand
Politics of the Wellington Region
1910s in Wellington